The Spirit of Christmas, officially titled as Michael W. Smith & Friends: The Spirit of Christmas is a duet Christmas album by Christian recording artist Michael W. Smith, released on September 30, 2014, through Capitol Records. This is Smith's fourth Christmas album. His previous Christmas album, It's a Wonderful Christmas, was released in 2007. The Spirit of Christmas won 2015 Dove Award for Christmas Album of the Year.

Background 

This album features duets with several country music artists, including Carrie Underwood, Lady Antebellum, Little Big Town, Jennifer Nettles of Sugarland, Martina McBride, and Vince Gill. Other artists on it include U2 frontman Bono, Amy Grant, and Michael McDonald. Bono is featured in spoken word on the track "The Darkest Midnight."

Tour 

Cracker Barrel sponsored Smith's 2014 "Spirit of Christmas Tour", which started on November 30, 2014, and finished on December 21, 2014. The tour features a full symphony and consists of 14 shows, 3 of which were co-headlined with Amy Grant.

Smith toured this album again in 2015, also with Cracker Barrel sponsoring. This time Amy Grant was featured in 8 of 13 shows. The tour began on December 4, 2015 in Kentucky, and ended on December 20, 2015 in Virginia.

Critical reception 

Jeffrey Lee Puckett for The Courier Journal said the album "gets the season of holiday Christmas albums off to a big start."

Commercial performance 

The album sold 4,000 copies in its first week of release, debuted at No. 80 on the Billboard 200 and peaked at No. 16 . It also reached No. 13 on Top Album Sales Chart which counts traditional album sales and does not include streaming. On the Top Christian Albums Chart, the album debuted at No. 5 and peaked at No. 1. This marks Smith's third new album for 2014 to enter the Billboard 200. He previously released Sovereign, which debuted at No. 10 on the Billboard 200, selling 16,000 copies; and Hymns, which debuted at No. 25 with 12,000 copies. As of January 2015, The Spirit of Christmas has sold 145,000 copies.

Track listing

Personnel 
 Michael W. Smith – lead vocals (2–6, 8–12, 14), acoustic piano (6, 7–12, 14), arrangements (6–9), synthesizer (13)
 David Hamilton – orchestra arrangements and conductor (1, 2, 3, 5, 6, 7, 9–12, 14), synthesizer (1, 9, 12, 13), celeste (1, 6, 7), acoustic piano (2, 3, 5), backing vocals (3), Rhodes (4), arrangements (4, 5), percussion (9)
 Mark Baldwin – guitars (2, 3, 5, 8, 9, 12)
 Chris Rodriguez – guitars (2, 3, 5, 8, 9, 10, 12)
 Tom Hemby – guitars (4)
 Vince Gill – guitar solo (4), lead and harmony vocals (4)
 Craig Nelson – bass (2, 9, 12), upright bass (3, 4, 5)
 Scott Williamson – drums (2–5, 9, 12)
 Tyler Smith – percussion programming (9)
 Josephine Knight – cello solo (8)
 Skip Cleavinger – low whistle (13)
 The London Session Orchestra – orchestra (1, 2, 3, 5, 6, 7, 9–12, 14)
 Thomas Bowes – concertmaster
 Isobel Griffiths – orchestra contractor 
 Susie Gillis – orchestra contractor 
 Ric Domenico – music preparation 
 Ken Johnson – music preparation
 Laura Cooksey – backing vocals (3)
 Stephanie Hall-Wedan – backing vocals (3)
 Mark Ivey – backing vocals (3)
 Lady Antebellum – lead and backing vocals (5)
 Audrey Smith – lead vocal (6)
 The Nashville Children's Choir – choir (6, 12), directed by Kyle Hankins
 Little Big Town – lead and backing vocals (8)
 Martina McBride – lead vocals (9)
 Becca Hamilton – backing vocals (9)
 Amy Grant – lead vocals (10)
 Carrie Underwood – lead vocals (11)
 Jennifer Nettles – lead vocals (12)
 Bono – spoken word (13)
 Michael McDonald – harmony vocals (14)

Choir on "Almost There
 Melodie Kirkpatrick – contractor
 Jason Barton, April Duren, Mike Eldred, Rod Fletcher, Shelley Jennings, Tammy Jensen, Shelly Justice, Melodie Kirkpatrick, Jamiee Paul, Michelle Swift, Gary Robinson and David Wise – singers

Production 
 Robert Deaton – executive producer, producer
 Greg Ham – executive producer 
 Michael W. Smith – executive producer, producer
 David Hamilton – producer, editing, BGV recording (3, 9), vocal recording (MWS vocal on 5, 8, 9, 11, 14), celeste recording (6, 7), low whistle recording (13)
 Rob Burrell – rhythm track recording, editing, mixing, mastering, vocal recording (2-6, 8, 10-14), piano recording (6, 7, 8, 14), guitar recording (10), children's choir recording (12)
 Kam Luchterhand – rhythm track recording assistant 
 Richard Swor – vocal recording assistant (2-6, 8, 10-14), children's choir recording assistant (12)
 Matt Rausch – recording (Vince Gill's guitar on 4), vocal recording (Amy Grant's vocal on 10)
 Chris Barrett – piano recording (10, 11)
 Brad Pooler – vocal recording assistant (MWS vocal on 5, 8, 9, 11, 14), vocal recording (Audrey Smith's vocal on 6), guitar recording (10)
 Allen Ditto – vocal recording (Martina McBride's vocal on 9)
 David Schober – choir recording (10)
 Mark Casselman – vocal recording (Michael McDonald's vocal on 14)
 Ken Johnson – production manager 
 Sarah Sung – art and design 
 Cameron Powell – photography 
 Christin Cook – grooming 
 Tasia Treimer – wardrobe stylist
 The MWS Group – management

Studios
 Ronnie's Place Studio (Nashville, Tennessee) – rhythm track recording
 Blackbird Studios (Nashville, Tennessee) – vocal recording 
 The House (Nashville, Tennessee) – guitar recording, vocal recording
 The Tracking Room (Nashville, Tennessee) – choir recording 
 AIR Studios (Lyndhurst Hall, London, UK) – orchestra recording, piano recording 
 Paragon Studios (Franklin, Tennessee) – vocal recording, piano recording, children's choir recording 
 The Manor (Franklin, Tennessee) – vocal recording, guitar recording 
 Studiowave (Brentwood, Tennessee) – BGV recording, celeste recording, guitar recording, low whistle recording 
 Sound Logic (Santa Barbara, California) – vocal recording 
 emotionmix studios – mixing and mastering location

Charts

References 

Michael W. Smith albums
2014 Christmas albums
Capitol Records Christmas albums
Christmas albums by American artists
Country Christmas albums
Vocal duet albums